Modern Heart may refer to:

 Modern Heart (Champaign album), 1983
 Modern Heart (Milow album), 2016